Come All You Madmen  is the fourth album from Los Angeles-based punk rock band The Briggs. The album was released June 17, 2008 through SideOneDummy Records and was produced by The Mighty Mighty Bosstones' Joe Gittleman, as with their previous album Back to Higher Ground.

Track listing 
"Madmen" – 2:31
"This Is L.A." – 3:40
"Bloody Minds" – 4:06
"What Was I Thinking?" – 2:46
"Charge Into The Sun" – 3:14
"Not Alone" – 3:43
"Ship of Fools" – 2:58
"This Ship Is Now Sinking" – 3:31
"Oblivion" – 4:03
"Until Someone Gets Hurt" – 3:02
"Final Words" – 3:38
"Molly" – 4:30

Personnel

Band members
 Jason LaRocca – guitar, vocals
 Joey LaRocca - vocals, guitar
 Ryan Roberts – bass guitar
 Chris X - drums

Additional musicians
 Ken Casey - vocals on "Mad Men"
 Dicky Barrett – vocals on "Charge Into The Sun"
 Brian Baker - guitar on "Charge Into The Sun" and "Bloody Minds"
 Tim Burton, Kevin Lenear, and Chris Rhodes - horns on "Bloody Minds"
 Jeremy Conrad - percussion, orchestral snare
 Joe Gittleman – production

References

Punknews Article

The Briggs albums
2008 albums
SideOneDummy Records albums